The Lay of the Land is a 1997 American comedy-drama film written by Mel Shapiro, directed by Larry Arrick and starring Sally Kellerman and Ed Begley Jr.  It is based on Shapiro's play of the same name.

Plot

Cast
Sally Kellerman as Mary Jane Dankworth
Ed Begley Jr. as Harvey Dankworth
Sandra Taylor as Muriel Johanson
Stuart Margolin as Carmine Ficcone
Tyne Daly as Dr. Guttmacher
Rance Howard as Dr. Brown
Avery Schreiber as Dean Bill Whittier
April Shawhan as Erma Whittier
Tom Nowicki as Bob Chambers
Elisabeth Redford as Blanche Cafferty

References

External links
 

American comedy-drama films
American films based on plays
1990s English-language films
1990s American films